Mark Coyne (born November 19, 1962) is an American musician and one of the original members of the rock band the Flaming Lips. Coyne co-founded the group along with his brother Wayne in Norman, Oklahoma, in 1983. The original lineup of the Flaming Lips was Mark on lead vocals, Wayne on guitar, and Michael Ivins on bass. Mark left the band in 1985 (shortly after their self-titled debut EP was released) around the time of his wedding. Upon Mark's departure, Wayne assumed lead vocalist and songwriting duties.

Some of the 1985 demos that Mark sang on were released as a part of the Finally the Punk Rockers Are Taking Acid compilation.

References

External links 
Brief biography at The Flaming Lips' official site

1962 births
Living people
The Flaming Lips members
Singers from Oklahoma